The 1926 New York Giants season was the franchise's 44th season. The team finished in fifth place in the National League with a 74–77 record, 13½ games behind the St. Louis Cardinals.

Regular season

Season standings

Record vs. opponents

Opening Day lineup 
Heinie Groh 3B
Frankie Frisch 2B
Ross Youngs RF
Irish Meusel RF
High Pockets Kelly 1B
Ty Tyson CF
Travis Jackson SS
Frank Snyder C
Virgil Barnes P

Notable transactions 
 June 14, 1926: Billy Southworth was traded by the Giants to the St. Louis Cardinals for Heinie Mueller.

Roster

Player stats

Batting

Starters by position 
Note: Pos = Position; G = Games played; AB = At bats; H = Hits; Avg. = Batting average; HR = Home runs; RBI = Runs batted in

Other batters 
Note: G = Games played; AB = At bats; H = Hits; Avg. = Batting average; HR = Home runs; RBI = Runs batted in

Pitching

Starting pitchers 
Note: G = Games pitched; IP = Innings pitched; W = Wins; L = Losses; ERA = Earned run average; SO = Strikeouts

Other pitchers 
Note: G = Games pitched; IP = Innings pitched; W = Wins; L = Losses; ERA = Earned run average; SO = Strikeouts

Relief pitchers 
Note: G = Games pitched; W = Wins; L = Losses; SV = Saves; ERA = Earned run average; SO = Strikeouts

Notes

References 
 1926 New York Giants team page at Baseball Reference
 1926 New York Giants team page at Baseball Almanac

New York Giants (NL)
San Francisco Giants seasons
New York Giants season
New York Giants MLB
1920s in Manhattan
Washington Heights, Manhattan